The Post Office Building in Greenville, Texas, was built in 1910.  It was listed on the National Register of Historic Places in 1974.  It was at this post office on June 20, 1942, that Audie Murphy enlisted in the United States Army.

See also

National Register of Historic Places listings in Hunt County, Texas

References

External links

Post office buildings on the National Register of Historic Places in Texas
Neoclassical architecture in Texas
Government buildings completed in 1919
Buildings and structures in Hunt County, Texas
National Register of Historic Places in Hunt County, Texas